La Mère Brazier is a restaurant in the 1st arrondissement of Lyon, Lyon Metropolis, France. The restaurant was established in 1921 and was awarded the prestigious 3 Michelin stars under its founder and chef, Eugénie Brazier, between 1933 and 1968. It held two Michelin stars in the 2018 Guide.

See also
List of Michelin starred restaurants

References

External links
Official Website

Restaurants in Lyon
Michelin Guide starred restaurants in France
Restaurants established in 1921